Paphies subtriangulata is a species of edible bivalve clam known as tuatua in the Māori language, a member of the family Mesodesmatidae and endemic to New Zealand. It is found on all three of the main New Zealand islands, buried in fine clean sand on ocean beaches.

The large shell is asymmetrical, with the hinge at one side. Its closest relative, the pipi (Paphies australis), has a symmetrical shell.

The soft parts of the animal are an edible delicacy, made into fritters or boiled and served on the shell. Historically the species has been used as a food source by the Māori, and its shell is a common component of excavated Māori middens.

The clam burrows beneath the sand, and does so very quickly, making it a challenge to dig for at times. It also squirts water when threatened. All tuatua are protected with legal limits on their capture. In some areas one digger may bag no more than 50 to 150 tuatuas per day, depending on location.

Subspecies
Three subspecies have been recognised:
Paphies subtriangulata porrecta (Marwick, 1928)Distribution: Chatham Islands Maximum length: , maximum height: .

References

Powell A. W. B., New Zealand Mollusca, William Collins Publishers Ltd, Auckland, New Zealand 1979 

Commercial molluscs
Bivalves of New Zealand
Endemic fauna of New Zealand
Mesodesmatidae
Bivalves described in 1828
Taxa named by William Wood (zoologist)
New Zealand seafood
Endemic molluscs of New Zealand